Thomas A. Stewart (March 2, 1848 – April 22, 1920) was an American farmer and politician.

Biography
Born in Verona, Wisconsin, Stewart studied at the Northwestern Business College and University of Wisconsin. He was a farmer and stock raiser, and he married Jessie Rutherford (1850–1913) of Verona. He served on the Dane County Board of Supervisors and in local government. He served in the Wisconsin State Assembly from 1907 to 1911 and again from 1913 to 1915 as a Democrat. He died in Verona, Wisconsin.

References

External links

1848 births
1920 deaths
19th-century American businesspeople
People from Verona, Wisconsin
Madison Business College alumni
University of Wisconsin–Madison alumni
Businesspeople from Wisconsin
County supervisors in Wisconsin
Democratic Party members of the Wisconsin State Assembly